Xu Wang (born 6 December 1990 in Zhuanghe, Liaoning province) is a male Chinese long-distance runner. He competed in the marathon event at the 2015 World Championships in Athletics in Beijing, China.

See also
 China at the 2015 World Championships in Athletics

References

External links

Living people
1990 births
Place of birth missing (living people)
Chinese male long-distance runners
Chinese male marathon runners
World Athletics Championships athletes for China
Athletes from Dalian
Runners from Liaoning